is a passenger railway station in the city of Narita, Chiba, Japan, operated by the East Japan Railway Company (JR East).

Lines

Station layout
Shimōsa-Manzaki Station has two opposed side platforms connected by a footbridge. The station building is a wooden, single-story structure. The station is staffed.

Platforms

History
Shimōsa-Manzaki Station opened on August 10, 1901 as a station of the Narita Railway Company for both freight and passenger operations. On September 1, 1920, the Narita Railway was nationalised, becoming part of the Japanese Government Railway (JGR).  After World War II, the JGR became the Japanese National Railways (JNR). The station was absorbed into the JR East network upon the privatization of JNR on April 1, 1987. The station building was repaired and modernized from 2006-2007.

Passenger statistics
In fiscal 2019, the station was used by an average of 710 passengers daily (boarding passengers only).

Surrounding area
 
 Chiba Prefectural Narita Seiryo High School

See also
 List of railway stations in Japan

References

External links

JR East station information 

Railway stations in Chiba Prefecture
Stations of East Japan Railway Company
Railway stations in Narita, Chiba
Railway stations in Japan opened in 1901